George Dwyer O'Day (May 19, 1923 – July 26, 1987) was an American sailor, Olympic champion and world champion, and boat designer. He was born in Brookline, Massachusetts, and died in Dover, Massachusetts.  He graduated from Harvard University in 1945.

Sailor
O'Day received a gold medal in the 5.5 Metre class at the 1960 Summer Olympics in Rome. He won the world champion title twelve times in various classes.

Boat designer
In 1958 O'Day founded the company O'Day Corp. The same year, together with the English boat designer Uffa Fox, O'Day co-designed the Day Sailer. The boat was inducted into the American Sailboat Hall of Fame in 2003. O'Day was inducted into the National Sailing Hall of Fame in 2014.

References

External links
 
 
 

1923 births
1987 deaths
American male sailors (sport)
Sailors at the 1960 Summer Olympics – 5.5 Metre
Olympic gold medalists for the United States in sailing
Medalists at the 1960 Summer Olympics
Harvard University alumni